The breeds of domestic goat reported to DAD-IS from China were in 2014:

 Baiyu Black
 Banjiao
 Chaidamu
 Chengde Horn Down
 Chengdu Grey
 Chuandong White
 Daiyun
 Dou'an
 Fengqing Horn Down Black
 Funiu White
 Fuqing
 Ganxi
 Guangfeng
 Guanzhong Dairy
 Guishan
 Guizhou White
 Gulin Grey
 Hexi Cashmere
 Huai
 Huanghuai
 Inner Mongolian Cashmere
 Jianchang Black
 Jining Grey
 Laoshan Dairy
 Leizhou
 Liaoning Cashmere
 Linchang Long-wool
 Longling
 Lubei White
 Luliang Black
 Maguan Horn Down
 Matou
 Nanjiang Grey
 Shaanan White
 Shanbei White Cashmere
 Taihang
 Taihang Mountain Goat
 Taiwan
 Tibetan
 Wu'an
 Xiangdong Black
 Xinjiang
 Xuhuai
 Ya'an Dairy
 Yanbian Dairy
 Yangste River Delta White
 Yichang White
 Yimeng Black
 Yunling 
 Zhaotong
 Zhongwei
 Ziwuling Black

References

 
Goats